The East Mormon Mountains is a mountain range in Lincoln County, Nevada.  As their name implies, they are east of the Mormon Mountains.

References 

Mountain ranges of Nevada
Mountain ranges of Lincoln County, Nevada